Starokochkildino (İśke Küskilde) is a rural locality (a village) in Urmiyazovsky Selsoviet, Askinsky District, Bashkortostan, Russia. The population was 274 as of 2010. There are 2 streets.

Geography 
Starokochkildino is located 22 km east of Askino (the district's administrative centre) by road. Novokochkildino is the nearest rural locality.

References 

Rural localities in Askinsky District